The Quadrant:MK is Network Rail's national operations centre in Milton Keynes. After being topped out in April 2011, it opened in June 2012.

The complex was designed by GMW Architects and built by Royal BAM Group. The centre is on the site of the former England National Hockey Stadium, adjacent to Milton Keynes Central railway station.

References

Buildings and structures in Milton Keynes
Network Rail
Office buildings completed in 2012
2012 establishments in England